Kuwaiti parliamentary election, 2012 may refer to:
 Kuwaiti parliamentary election, February 2012
 Kuwaiti parliamentary election, December 2012